Gardner Township may refer to:

 Gardner Township, Sangamon County, Illinois
 Gardner Township, Johnson County, Kansas
 Gardner Township, Buffalo County, Nebraska
 Gardner Township, Cass County, North Dakota, in Cass County, North Dakota

Township name disambiguation pages